Xanthophyllum schizocarpon is a tree in the family Polygalaceae. The specific epithet  is from the Greek meaning "split fruit", referring to the deeply furrowed fruit.

Description
The smooth bark is grey or brownish. The flowers are yellow.

Distribution and habitat
Xanthophyllum schizocarpon is endemic to Borneo. Its habitat is mixed dipterocarp forests from sea-level to  altitude.

References

schizocarpon
Endemic flora of Borneo
Trees of Borneo
Plants described in 1929